The 1924 Georgia Bulldogs football team represented the Georgia Bulldogs of the University of Georgia during the 1924 Southern Conference football season. In the team's second season under head coach George Cecil Woodruff, the Bulldogs completed the season with a record of 7–3–0.  It included a narrow 7–6 loss to football powerhouse Yale.  The other losses in the season came in the last two games against Southern Conference (SoCon) champion Alabama and Southern champion Centre. Six of the seven wins in the season were shutouts.

The season was also notable for the victory over Vanderbilt by a single Scrappy Moore drop kick,' in which All-American Vanderbilt end Lynn Bomar also suffered his career ending injury. Moore's field goal was the last made by a Bulldog until seventeen years later when Frank Sinkwich did so against Florida with a broken jaw in 1941.

All-Southerns included end Smack Thompson and tackle Jim Taylor.

Schedule

References

Georgia
Georgia Bulldogs football seasons
Georgia Bulldogs football